Poraka (in Macedonian: Порака) is the sixth solo album by the Macedonian singer Kaliopi, released in the 2010.

Background
The follow-up album to Oblivion, Kaliopi worked with different producers on Poraka. There are 10 new songs in the album. Co-production was by Tihomir Preradović and mastering was completed at GS Global Studio in Sweden. The album cover was shot by Dejan Milicevic.

Production history
The complete album is made by different producers and Kaliopi. It was recorded in different studios like studio D'Knock Production, Studio Slow Mo'T.Production. It contains 10 songs with different styles. The cover is made by Dejan Milicevic from Serbia and the graphic design is by Bojan Sredojević. It was released in 2010 together with the music video for the song "Poraka" and Serbian version of album "Poruka".

Track listings
"Poraka" (4:10)
Credits: Kaliopi/D.Juranović-Kaliopi-T.Preradovićlyrics: D.Juranović "D'Knock"
"Ne sum Kako Ti" (3:28)
Credits: D.Juranović/M.Rus/T.Preradovićarrangement: R.Grilllyrics: Kaliopi/M.Rus-D.Juranović "D'Knock"/T.Preradović
"Tvoja" (3:17)
Credits: D.Juranović, Kaliopi-D.Juranović "D'Knock"/T.Preradović
"Ti" (3:27)
Credits: D.Juranović/Kaliopi/T.Preradovićlyrics: Kaliopi-T.Preradović/D.Juranović "D'Knock"
"Pej Mi" (3:42)
Credits: Kaliopi/D.Juranović-Kaliopi-T.Preradović/D.Juranović "D'Knock"
"Dojdi feat.Rambo Amadeus" (3:02)
Credits: D.Juranović/Kaliopi-Rambo Amadeus-D.Juranović "D'Knock"/T.Preradović"
"Zemi Me" (3:55)
Credits: Kaliopi-Kaliopi-P.Bogdanović/T.Preradović/D.Juranović "D'Knock"
"Bam baram bam" (3:47)
Credits: Kaliopi/D.Juranović-Kaliopi-D.Juranović "D'Knock"/T.Preradović
"Denot Se Budi" (4:40)
music: Kaliopi-Marko Vozelj-T.Preradović/D.Juranović "D'Knock"
"Ako još ikad padne snijeg feat.Edin Karamazov" (5:04)
Credits: M.Rus-М.Rus-Т.Preradović/D.Juranović "D'Knock"/Е.Karamazov

References

2010 albums
Kaliopi albums